Ukrainsk is a city in Selydove municipality, Donetsk Oblast (province) of Ukraine. Population: ; 13,236 (2001).

References

Cities in Donetsk Oblast
Populated places established in the Ukrainian Soviet Socialist Republic
Cities of district significance in Ukraine
Pokrovsk Raion